Cuba competed at the 2011 World Aquatics Championships in Shanghai, China between July 16 and 31, 2011.

Diving

Cuba has qualified 7 athletes in diving.

Men

Women

Swimming

Cuba qualified 3 swimmers.

Men

Synchronised swimming

Cuba has qualified 4 athletes in synchronised swimming.

Women

Water polo

Women

Team Roster

Mairelis Lisandra Zunzunegui Morgan - Captain
Daniela Escalona Santos
Yeliana Caridad Bravo Curro
Hirovis Hernendez Consuegra
Danay Gutierrez More
Mayelin Bernal Villa
Yanet Lopez Hernandez
Yadira Oms Barroso
Dayana Morales Marrero
Yordanka Pujol Palacio
Lisbeth Santana Sosa
Neldys Truffin Abreu
Arisney Ramos Betancourt

Group D

Playoff round

Classification 9–12

Ninth place game

References

Nations at the 2011 World Aquatics Championships
2011
World Aquatics Championships